Burrow fossils are the remains of burrows - holes or tunnels excavated into the ground or seafloor - by animals to create a space suitable for habitation, temporary refuge, or as a byproduct of locomotion preserved in the rock record. Because burrow fossils represent the preserved byproducts of behavior rather than physical remains, they are considered a kind of trace fossil. One common kind of burrow fossil is known as Skolithos, and the similar Trypanites, Ophiomorpha and Diplocraterion.

Vertebrate burrows

Fish burrows
Fossil Lungfish burrows are preserved in the Rocky Point Member of the Chinle Formation in Canyonlands National Park.

Invertebrate burrows
Examples are Treptichnus pedum and Arenicolites franconicus.

See also

Trace fossil - a fossil record of biological activity but not the preserved remains of the plant or animal itself.

Footnotes

References
 Hunt, ReBecca K., Vincent L. Santucci and Jason Kenworthy. 2006. "A preliminary inventory of fossil fish from National Park Service units." in S.G. Lucas, J.A. Spielmann, P.M. Hester, J.P. Kenworthy, and V.L. Santucci (ed.s), Fossils from Federal Lands. New Mexico Museum of Natural History and Science Bulletin 34, pp. 63–69.

Burrow fossils